BBC Oxford is the name given to the sub-opt out region serving Oxford and the surrounding areas. Its services include:
BBC Oxford News, the local news service called BBC Oxford on screen
BBC Radio Oxford, the local radio station occasionally branded as BBC Oxford 95.2FM.

Creation
The region was created following the splitting up of the former BBC South East region to form BBC London, the current BBC South East region and a smaller service for Oxford that would be an opt out from South Today.

Oxford
Mass media in Oxfordshire